Le Sénéchal de Kerkado (c. 1786 – c. 1805) was a French composer.

She had her first opera performed at the age of nineteen; La méprise volontaire ou La double leçon (1805), with libretto by Alexandre Duval, was produced at the Opéra-Comique in Paris on June 5, 1805.

References

1786 births
1805 deaths
19th-century classical composers
French women classical composers
French music educators
French opera composers
19th-century French composers
Women opera composers
Women music educators
19th-century women composers